David Leonardo Castro Cortés (born 12 May 1989) is a Colombian footballer who played as a forward for Kaizer Chiefs in the Premier Soccer League.

References

External links
 Leonardo Castro at BDFA.com.ar 
 

1989 births
Living people
Colombian footballers
Categoría Primera A players
Peruvian Primera División players
Millonarios F.C. players
La Equidad footballers
Club Alianza Lima footballers
Colegio Nacional Iquitos footballers
Cúcuta Deportivo footballers
Águilas Doradas Rionegro players
Universitario de Sucre footballers
Mamelodi Sundowns F.C. players
Colombian expatriate footballers
Expatriate footballers in Peru
Expatriate footballers in Bolivia
Expatriate soccer players in South Africa
Association football forwards
Footballers from Bogotá
Kaizer Chiefs F.C. players
Colombian expatriate sportspeople in Peru
Colombian expatriate sportspeople in Bolivia
Colombian expatriate sportspeople in South Africa
South African Premier Division players